Kleman is a surname. Notable people with the surname include:

Anna Kleman (1862–1940), Swedish insurance officer and feminist
Ellen Kleman (1867–1943), Swedish writer, newspaper editor, and women's rights activist, sister of Anna
Maurice Kleman (1934–2021), French physicist